Kuzucu can refer to:

 Kuzucu, Havsa
 Kuzucu, Mezitli